Louis Méthot (1793 – October 16, 1859) was a Quebec businessman and political figure.

He was born Louis Méthotte at Pointe-aux-Trembles, Lower Canada in 1793. Méthot was a merchant at Sainte-Croix. He served in the local militia during the War of 1812, becoming lieutenant. He was named justice of the peace. Méthot also served as commissioner for the construction of a bridge over the Chaudière River and a road in the region of Sainte-Croix. In 1830, he was elected to the Legislative Assembly of Lower Canada for Lotbinière, supporting the parti patriote, and was reelected in 1834. Méthot voted in support of the Ninety-Two Resolutions. In 1848, he was appointed to the Legislative Council of the Province of Canada; he was removed for non-attendance in 1857.

He died at Sainte-Croix in 1859.

His brothers François-Xavier and Antoine-Prosper were members of the legislative assembly for the Province of Canada.

References 

1793 births
1859 deaths
Members of the Legislative Assembly of Lower Canada
Members of the Legislative Council of the Province of Canada
Canadian justices of the peace